Peters House may refer to:

 Edward C. Peters House, Atlanta, GA, listed on the National Register of Historic Places (NRHP)
 Walker-Peters-Langdon House, Columbus, GA, listed on the NRHP in Georgia
 John Claus Peters House, Fort Wayne, IN, NRHP-listed
 Henry Peters House, Garrett, IN, listed on the NRHP in Indiana
 J. C. Peters House, Davenport, IA, listed on the NRHP in Iowa
 Peters House (Petersburg, Kentucky), listed on the NRHP in Kentucky
 John Peters House, Blue Hill, ME, listed on the NRHP in Maine
 Charles Peters, Sr., House, Saginaw, MI, listed on the NRHP in Michigan
 Ferdinand Peters House, Cold Spring, MN, listed on the NRHP in Minnesota
 Peters House (Florissant, Missouri), listed on the NRHP in Missouri
 Louis H. Peters House, Washington, MO, listed on the NRHP in Missouri
 Peters-Kupferschmid House, Cincinnati, OH, NRHP-listed
 Stevenson Peters House, Circleville, OH, NRHP-listed
 A. V. Peters House, Eugene, OR, NRHP-listed
 Peters House (Milford, Pennsylvania), NRHP-listed
 Peters-Graham House, Greensboro, PA, NRHP-listed
 William Peters House, Mendenhall, PA, NRHP-listed
 Peters House (Knoxville, Tennessee), NRHP-listed
 George Peters House, Black Creek, WI, NRHP-listed